Punton is a surname. Notable people with the surname include:

Bill Punton (born 1934), Scottish footballer and manager
Bill Punton (born 1957), English footballer
Noel Punton (1931–2017), Australian gymnast

See also
Penton (surname)